The Men's Individual Class 8 table tennis competition at the 2008 Summer Paralympics was held between 7 September and 11 September at the Peking University Gymnasium.

Classes 6–10 were for athletes with a physical impairment who competed from a standing position; the lower the number, the greater the impact the impairment had on an athlete's ability to compete.

The event was won by Chen Gang, representing .

Results

Preliminary round

Group A

Group B

Group C

Group D

Competition bracket

References

M